On March 18, 2018, in Riverview, Florida, 29-year-old Ronnie Oneal III fatally shot his girlfriend, 33-year-old Kenyatta Barron, and hacked their 9-year-old daughter, Ron'Niveya Oneal, to death with an axe.  He stabbed their 8-year-old son Ronnie Oneal IV, who survived and told detectives "My father shot my mother" before being escorted to a local hospital.

Oneal was convicted of two counts of first-degree murder, one count of attempted first-degree murder, two counts of aggravated child abuse, one count of arson, and one count of resisting a law enforcement officer.  On July 23, 2021, he was given three consecutive life sentences without the possibility of parole, plus 90 years.

Events
At 11:43 p.m. EDT, the Hillsborough County Sheriff's Office received a 911 emergency call from an unknown woman, now believed to have been Kenyatta. An unknown male voice can be heard screaming "Allahu Akbar" (which means "God is the greatest"). Then the female caller said, "I’m so sorry Ronnie," as she screamed loudly. A male caller could be heard in the background saying, "She killed me," and, "Don’t come outside, call 911 now," according to the news release. The 911 call ended shortly thereafter.

Eight minutes later, a second 911 call came in at 11:51 p.m., this time featuring a male caller claiming to have been attacked by "white demons" and accusing Kenyatta (addressed as "Ke-Ke" in the call) of trying to kill him, and that he "just killed her." Ronnie III gave their home address.

Deputies arrived at the home at 11:49 p.m. to find a woman, later identified as Kenyatta, lying unconscious in the yard of the home at the mentioned address. Prior to killing her, Ronnie III yelled, "Come in here, kill this bitch!"

Ronnie III also beat his daughter Ron'Niveya with a hatchet, killing her, and stabbed his son, Ronnie IV, leaving him critically wounded. Ronnie III then proceeded to set fire to their home. Ronnie IV escaped the home with stab wounds and burns and told a detective, "My father shot my mother," before being promptly transported to a hospital for treatment.

Ronnie III resisted arrest until being tasered by police. While inside the squad car, he called his murdered victim Kenyatta "the devil" and said, "the kids are the devil's kids." He was booked into Hillsborough County Jail the next day.

On March 22, four days after the attack, Ronnie IV told detectives his account of the events of March 18 that left his mother and sister dead.

Trial and sentencing
The trial for Ronnie III began on June 16, 2021. Ronnie III served as his own attorney in addition to his counsel, cross-examining his surviving son Ronnie IV, who testified as a witness for the prosecution. Throughout the trial, Ronnie III claimed that his son had lied to investigators about the incident. Ronnie III asked him, "Did I hurt you that night of the incident?" and the boy replied "Yes." Ronnie III then asked him, "How did I hurt you?" The boy replied, "You stabbed me."

Initially, Ronnie III's attorneys filed motions claiming that Ronnie III was acting in self-defense and requesting to defend Ronnie III on the basis of Florida's stand-your-ground law. However, the judge rejected this request, finding Ronnie III ineligible for a stand-your-ground defense. On June 21, 2021, Ronnie III was found guilty of two counts of first-degree murder, one count of attempted first-degree murder, two counts of aggravated child abuse, one count of arson, and one count of resisting a law enforcement officer. On July 23, 2021, he was given three life sentences without the possibility of parole, plus 90 years, running consecutively.

Reflecting on the case during sentencing, Judge Michelle Sisco described it as the "worst case [she's] ever seen" in her nearly twenty-year judicial career and described Ronnie III's actions toward his daughter as "abject cruelty." State Attorney Andrew Warren's response to the attacks was "These murders are among the most cruel and vicious our community has ever seen."

Aftermath
On November 25, 2019, Ronnie IV was adopted by detective Mike Blair, who cared for him the night of the murders. Ronnie IV changed his name to Ronnie Blair when he joined the family of seven, including Mike, his wife Danyel, and their five other children, ages 16 to 23. Mike recalled the night of the murders, saying that there was "no expectation Ronnie would live" and that he considers Ronnie's recovery to be a miracle. Of the adoption, Ronnie says that he is "loved" and "part of the family."

References

2018 in Florida
2018 murders in the United States
Filicides in Florida
March 2018 crimes in the United States
March 2018 events in the United States
Violence against women in the United States